Harold Edward William Pole (25 March 1922 — 13 December 2010) was an English footballer who played as a centre forward.

Career
In 1946, Pole signed for Ipswich Town from Gorleston. Pole scored 13 times in 39 Football League games for Ipswich. In 1951, Pole signed for Leyton Orient, where he made 13 appearances, before joining Chelmsford City.

References

1922 births
2010 deaths
Association football forwards
English footballers
People from Waveney District
Ipswich Town F.C. players
Leyton Orient F.C. players
Chelmsford City F.C. players
Gorleston F.C. players
English Football League players